Anthony Rushe D.D. (died 1 April 1577) was a Canon of Windsor from 1566 to 1577 and Dean of Chichester from 1570 to 1577.

Career
He was a scholar at The King's School, Canterbury and educated at Magdalen College, Oxford where he graduated BA in 1554. He was awarded MA in 1558 from Cambridge.

He was appointed:
Master of The King's School, Canterbury 1561
Chaplain to Thomas Radclyffe, 3rd Earl of Sussex
Rector of Woodham Walter, Essex 1565
Rector of Brightling, Sussex 1565 - 1569
Rector of Calverton, Buckinghamshire 1566
Chaplain to Queen Elizabeth I
Rector of Osgarwick, Kent 1568
Canon of Canterbury Cathedral 1568
Rector of St Olave's Church, Southwark 1569
Dean of Chichester 1570 - 1577

He was appointed to the fourth stall in St George's Chapel, Windsor Castle in 1566 and held this until he died in 1577. He was buried in the chapel.

Notes 

1577 deaths
Canons of Windsor
Alumni of Magdalen College, Oxford
People educated at The King's School, Canterbury
Year of birth missing
Burials at St George's Chapel, Windsor Castle